Changunarayan is a municipality in Bhaktapur District in the Province No. 3 of Nepal and is part of the urban agglomeration of the Kathmandu Valley. The municipality was created through the merger of the former Village development committees Old-Changunarayan, Chhaling, Duwakot and Jhaukhel in 2014.
At the time of the 2011 Nepal census, the predecessors of  Changunarayan Municipality had a population of 55,430. In 2017, the municipality of Mahamanjushree Nagarkot was merged into Changunarayan. The municipality is also home to the UNESCO World Heritage Site Changu Narayan.

See also
Changu Narayan

References

Populated places in Bhaktapur District